This is a list of episodes for the remake of the Japanese anime series Yatterman. The anime was first aired in Japan on NTV and Yomiuri TV from January 14, 2008 to September 27, 2009. The series contains sixty episodes.

Episodes

References

External links
Official Site
yatterman.jp

Yatterman